Arbab Umar Farooq  is a Pakistani politician who is currently serving as a member of the Senate of Pakistan from Balochistan since March 2021. He belongs to Awami National Party (ANP).

References

Living people
Year of birth missing (living people)
Pakistani Senators 2021–2027
Awami National Party politicians